Superboy and the Ravers is an American comic book series that ran for 19 issues, from September 1996 to March 1998. The comic book chronicles the adventures of Superboy (Kon-El) and a group of superhumans called the Ravers.

Plot 
Beginning around the end of the 'losing it' saga, Sparx shows up and tells Superboy of a neverending party that she herself has joined. One night she takes Superboy there by teleportation. Superboy during this also meets Hero Cruz, and Aura, after an altercation with some of the partygoers where Superboy finds that he doesn't understand their language. Superboy thus intrigued meets Kindred Marx the proprietor of the rave called The Event Horizon who offered Superboy a handshake and after receiving a shock discovered that in the back of his right glove he now has a white rising sun symbol; Hero Cruz informs Supes that the mark is not on his glove but in his hand, and as long as he wishes to return to the party he can do so by touching the mark, and if he wishes to return home he only has to touch it again during the time that he is in the rave.

During that time Superboy starts to enjoy himself when he is confronted by Kaliber, a juvenile delinquent from the planet Qward, who accuses Superboy of mocking Superman at which time he begins to attack him. When Marx warns them that there is to be no fighting in the Rave he then transports them to the arena where they begin to fight. At this time the Rave's DJ informs Marx that they are being pursued and leaves without Superboy and Kaliber, who discover that their pursuers are a group called Inter.C.E.P.T.

During this time Kaliber and Superboy manage to fight off Inter.C.E.P.T. and thus Kaliber gains a lot of respect for Superboy and idolizes him for the remainder of the series, to the point of defending him from threats by which Superboy is obviously not in any danger of being overpowered.

Aura and her group calling themselves the fashion police are confronted by a mysterious zombie-like teenager calling himself Half-Life. Half-Life is a 1950s teenager who was killed by an alien spaceship's wreck. Its technology somehow keeps him alive (at least to an extent), with a green glowing ectoplasmic goo which takes up about half of his body, and which he can shoot at villains.  He has vowed revenge for the death of his family and girlfriend (whom he later reveals had been pregnant). He feels he does not fit in with the Ravers at first. Later, he wins a fancy alien motorcycle in a game of Truth or Dare, as well as becoming more a part of the group.

During an altercation with some Khundians who have repeatedly violated the rules of the Event Horizon, Marx revokes their passes; when one of them says that sending them back would be like signing their death warrants, Marx shows no remorse in taking them, saying, "I am prepared to face the consequences of my actions, prepare to face yours", showing that he will take the pass from anyone that violates the rules of the Event Horizon if they cross him, even if it means that they return to their homes and face death. It is also revealed that the Event Horizon is on the run from the Darkstars.
    
The Ravers group played vital parts in the limited series Genesis. The teleportation abilities the group were able to utilize were vital for the collected heroes of Earth. They also provided muscle during the battle against the forces of Darkseid and the simultaneous trip into the Source Wall, a battle in which Kaliber lost his vision after seeing the source directly.

On a trip to Metropolis, they confront the villain Metallo. After his defeat, his enormous, metallic fists remained behind. The group converts them into housing for the needy.

Tensions arise in the group when Sparx discovers she cannot handle Hero Cruz's homosexuality.

The long-lived sentient canine Rex the Wonder Dog has made several appearances in the book, associated with his new 'owner', Hero Cruz.

Other characters in the comic include Aura, Superboy, Sparx, Kalliber, and Half-Life.

Aftermath
 Superboy would go on to join Young Justice, and eventually become a founding member of the most recent incarnation of the Teen Titans.
 Hero joined up with the Teen Titans's California based branch, Titans West, before it was disbanded. He presumably retired from superheroics after this.
 Sparx was considered for membership in Teen Titans but was declined.
 Aura was chosen by Tim Drake as a candidate for the Teen Titans during a membership drive. Victor Stone promptly struck down the nomination, saying her habit of binge drinking could prove problematic.

References

External links 
 Comic Book Urban Legends Revealed #120 : "The Ravers in Superboy and the Ravers were intended as analogues for the Legion of Superheroes".

Superman titles
DC Comics titles
Superboy